A regional election took place in Champagne-Ardenne on March 21 and March 28, 2004, along with all other regions. Jean-Paul Bachy (PS) was elected President, defeating incumbent Jean-Claude Etienne (UMP).

Election results

External links
 Minister of the Interior (France) 2004 official results

Politics of Champagne-Ardenne
 
2004 elections in France